ʿAbū ʿAlī al‐Ḥusayn ibn Muḥammad al‐Ādamī (flourished in Baghdad ) was a maker of scientific instruments who wrote an extant work on vertical sundials, Techniques, Walls, and the Making of Sundials. The manuscript, which is held in the Bibliothèque nationale de France, contains tables that enabled the drawing of lines to show any desired angle of latitude. The surviving copy of al-Adami's 10th century manuscript (Arabe 2506,1 (fols. 1r-62r) dates from the 15th century, which King has suggested was written either by al-Adami or by a contemporary, Sa'id ibn Khafif al-Samarqandi. The tables on folios. 31v33v were intended to be used in the construction of a vertical sundial.

According to the Iranian polymath al-Biruni, al-Adami was the first to demonstrate solar and lunar eclipses using a "disc of eclipses".

The astrronomer Ibn al-Adami, who is thought by scholars to have been al-Adami's son, wrote  (now lost), a  that used information obtained from the Sindhind, an Indian source translated into Arabic by the 8th century mathematician and astronomer Ibrāhīm al-Fazārī. The  was first published in 949/950.

References

Sources
 
  (PDF version)

Further reading

External links
 Manuscript Arabe 2506 from Gallica, which contains the unique copy of al-Adami's treatise on vertical sundials

10th-century astronomers
Astronomers from the Abbasid Caliphate
Astronomers of the medieval Islamic world